Afrocominella is a genus of sea snails, marine gastropod mollusks in the superfamily Buccinoidea.

Species
Species within the genus Afrocominella include:
 Afrocominella capensis (Dunker in Philippi, 1844)
 Afrocominella turtoni (Bartsch, 1915)
Species brought into synonymy
 Afrocominella elongata: synonym of Afrocominella capensis simoniana (Petit de la Saussaye, 1852)
 Afrocominella multistriata (Turton, 1932): synonym of  Afrocominella capensis simoniana (Petit de la Saussaye, 1852)

References

 Vaught, K.C. (1989). A classification of the living Mollusca. American Malacologists: Melbourne, FL (USA). . XII, 195 pp.

External links
 Iredale, T. (1918). Molluscan nomenclatural problems and solutions.- No. 1. Proceedings of the Malacological Society of London. 13(1-2): 28-40

Buccinoidea (unassigned)
Gastropod genera